Krause (German for ruffle) is a common German surname.

Geographical distribution
As of 2014, 64.9% of all known bearers of the surname Krause were residents of Germany (frequency 1:531), 20.6% of the United States (1:7,541), 3.5% of Brazil (1:24,831), 2.4% of South Africa (1:9,550), 2.1% of Poland (1:7,891), 1.4% of Canada (1:11,446) and 1.2% of Australia (1:8,488).

In Germany, the frequency of the surname was higher than national average (1:531) in the following states:
 1. Brandenburg (1:204)
 2. Saxony-Anhalt (1:240)
 3. Mecklenburg-Vorpommern (1:250)
 4. Berlin (1:279)
 5. Saxony (1:305)
 6. Schleswig-Holstein (1:345)
 7. Thuringia (1:388)
 8. Lower Saxony (1:448)
 9. Bremen (1:464)
 10. Hamburg (1:506)

People
Alan Krause, a former Australian rules footballer who played with Melbourne
Albert A. Krause, (1841–1913), US Civil War Veteran, City Engineer of Buffalo NY, brother of Aurel Krause, great grandfather of Tory Bruno
Allison Krause (1951–1970), a student at Kent State University, Ohio who was shot and killed by the Ohio National Guard
Arnulf Krause (born 1955), a German philologist
Asuman Krause, a German-born former model and singer of mixed Turkish and German descent
Aurel Krause, (1848–1908), a German geographer known today for his early ethnography of the Tlingit Indians of southeast Alaska, brother of Albert Krause and great grand uncle of Tory Bruno
Axel Krause (born 1958), a German painter and graphic artist
Barbara Krause (born 1959), a former freestyle swimmer from East Germany
Beaver & Krause, a musical duo made up of Paul Beaver and Bernie Krause
Benjamin Krause, a German rugby union player
Bernhard Krause, (1910–1945), an Obersturmbannführer in the Waffen SS during World War II
Bernie Krause (born 1938), an American bioacoustician
Bob Krause (Athletic Director) (born 1945), former athletic director at Kansas State University
Bob Krause (politician) (born 1950), 2010 Democratic candidate for United States Senate from Iowa
Brian Krause (born 1969), an American actor
Carolyn H. Krause (born 1938), a Republican member of the Illinois House of Representatives
Charles I. Krause (1911–2002), an American labor union organizer and local executive
Charles Krause (gymnast), an American gymnast and Olympic medalist
Christiane Krause (born 1950), a German athlete who competed mainly in the 100 metres
Christopher Krause (born 1984), a German footballer who plays for Borussia Fulda
Dagmar Krause (born 1950), a German singer who works with Slapp Happy, Henry Cow and Art Bears
Dieter Krause (born 1936), an East German-German sprint canoer
Elisabeth Krause, a German-American astronomer
Ernst Hans Ludwig Krause (1859–1942), a German botanist
Ernst Henry Krause (1913–1989), an American nuclear physicist and aerospace executive
Ernst Krause (disambiguation), several people
Fedor Krause (1857–1937), a German neurosurgeon who was native of Friedland
George Krause (born 1937), an American artist photographer
Georg Krause (oologist) (1858 – 1915), German oologist
Gérard Krause (born 1965), a German epidemiologist
Greg Krause (born 1976), an Arena Football League offensive lineman for the Los Angeles Avengers
Gundula Krause (born 1966), a German folk violinist
Günther Krause (born 1953), a German politician
Hans-Henrik Krause (1918–2002), a Danish actor and film director
Harry Krause (1888–1940), a former professional baseball player
Helga Krause (1935–1989), a German film editor
Henry Krause (1913–1987), an American football offensive lineman
James Krause (fighter) (born 1986), American mixed martial artist
James Krause (footballer) (born 1987), English footballer
Jerry Krause, a longtime professional basketball scout and general manager
Johann Wilhelm Krause (botanist), (1764–1842), German botanist
John Krause (born 1983), an American soccer player
John D. Kraus (born 1910), US physicist, radio astronomer, inventor
Kai Krause (born 1957), a software artist, UI designer and founder of MetaCreations Corp
Karina Krause (born 1989), Thai volleyball player
Karl Christian Friedrich Krause (1781–1832), a German philosopher
Karl Friedrich Theodor Krause (1797–1868), a German anatomist
Karl Wilhelm Krause, (1911–2001), an SS officer, personal orderly and bodyguard to Adolf Hitler
Konstantin Krause (born 1967), a retired German long jumper
Lawrence B. Krause, an economist
Martin Krause (mathematician) (1851–1920), German mathematician and university rector
Martin Krause (1853–1918), a German concert pianist, piano teacher and writer on music
Matt Krause (born 1980), an American attorney and politician
Max Krause (1909–1984), an American football running back
Mel Krause (1928–2008), an American college baseball coach and player at the University of Oregon
Mikkel Krause (born 1988), a Danish curler
Moose Krause (1913–1992), a well-known collegiate basketball player during the 1930s
Nadine Krause (born 1982), a German handball player
Orla Hermann Krause (1867–1935), a Danish chess master and analyst
Paul Krause (born 1942), a former professional American football defensive back
Paul von Krause (1852-1923), German politician
Peter Krause (born 1965), an American film and television actor and film producer
Peter Krause (artist), an American illustrator and comic book artist
Piet Krause (Piet) Krause (born 1973), a former South African rugby union footballer
Roswitha Krause (born 1949), a German swimmer and team handball player
Rudolf Krause (1907–1987), a racing driver from East Germany
Ryan Krause (born 1981), an American football tight end
Sigrun Krause (born 1954), a former East German cross country skier who competed during the 1970s
Sonja Krause (born 1933), a Swiss-American polymer chemist
Tina Krause (born 1970), an American actress and model
Tom Krause (born 1934), a Finnish operatic baritone
Uwe Krause (born 1955), a German former footballer
Wilhelm Krause (anatomist) (1833–1910), a German anatomist who was born in Hannover
Wolf-Rüdiger Krause (born 1944), a German football coach and a former player

Krause can also refer to:
Krause Bottom, a riparian forest area on the Elwha River along the Geyser Valley trail in Olympic National Park, Washington
Krause Music Store, a two-story building in Chicago, the last commission by architect Louis Sullivan
Krause Publications, a publisher of magazines and books, especially their series of Standard Catalog of World Coins which are often referred to as the Krause Catalogues
Krause-Kivlin syndrome, a hereditary syndrome that mainly affects the eyes, growth and development
Krause's glands, small, mucous accessory lacrimal glands that are found underneath the eyelid where the upper and lower conductive meet
Bulboid corpuscle, cutaneous receptors in the human body
Otto Krause Technical School, an educational institution in Buenos Aires, Argentina
Villa Krause, the city of the Argentine of San Juan in the Cuyo Iowa

See also 
 Kraus
 Krauss
 Krauze
 Krausz

References

Surnames from nicknames
German-language surnames